This is a list of all lists of webcomics, sorted by varying classifications.

By genre or subject
List of webcomics with LGBT characters
List of video game webcomics
List of anthropomorphic (furry) webcomics
List of Heroes graphic novels

By date
List of early webcomics
1995 to 1999 in webcomics
2000 in webcomics
2001 in webcomics
2002 in webcomics
2003 in webcomics
2004 in webcomics
2005 in webcomics
2006 in webcomics
2007 in webcomics
2008 in webcomics
2009 in webcomics
2010 in webcomics
2011 in webcomics
2012 in webcomics
2013 in webcomics
2014 in webcomics
2015 in webcomics
2016 in webcomics
2017 in webcomics
2018 in webcomics
2019 in webcomics
2020 in webcomics

Other lists
List of webcomics in print

See also
Lists of comics
All lists marked as part of the Webcomics Work Group, a group within ProjectComics